Bourletiella arvalis is a species of globular springtails in the family Bourletiellidae.

References

External links

 

Collembola
Articles created by Qbugbot
Animals described in 1863